Peter Jönsson (born 11 February 1965) is a Swedish former footballer who played as a defender.

References

Association football defenders
Swedish footballers
Allsvenskan players
Malmö FF players
1965 births
Living people